Augustin is a name, a variant of Augustine used in several languages, and may refer to:

People

Surname
Notable persons with the surname of Augustin include:

 Aboobakar Augustin (born 1985), Mauritian footballer
 Anja Augustin (born 1974), German soprano
 Basilio Augustín (1840–1910), Spanish Governor General of the Philippines
 Celestin Augustin (born 1971), Madagascan Olympic boxer 
 D. J. Augustin (born 1987), American basketball player
 Eduard Augustin (born 1942), East German canoer
 Fernando Augustin (born 1980), Mauritian sprinter
 Ionel Augustin (born 1955), Romanian footballer
 Jean-Baptiste Jacques Augustin (1759–1832), French painter
 Jean-Kévin Augustin (born 1997), French professional football player
 Jean-Marc Augustin (born 1965), French boxer
 Jeremias Augustin (born 1985), Swedish ice hockey player
 Johan Samuel Augustin (1715–1785), German-Danish astronomical writer and civil servant
 Josef Augustin (born 1942), Czech chess master
 Larry Augustin, CEO of SugarCRM and venture capitalist
 Liane Augustin (1927–1978), German/Austrian singer and actress
 Ludovic Augustin (1902–?), Haitian Olympic sport shooter
 Marx Augustin (1643–1685), Austrian minstrel, bagpiper and poet
 Mary Ann Augustin (born 1954), Australian food chemist and dairy scientist
 Patrice Augustin (born 1955), French former footballer
 Radoslav Augustín (born 1987), Slovak footballer
See also
 Govert-Marinus Augustijn (1871–1963), Dutch potter
 Jonathan Joseph-Augustin (born 1981), French footballer
 Katrin Wagner-Augustin (born 1977), German canoer

Given name
Notable persons with the given name of Augustin include:

 Augustin Ahimana, Rwandan Anglican bishop
 Augustin Andriamananoro (born 1968), Madagascar politician
 Augustin Aubert (1781–1857), French painter
 Augustin Augier (1758–1825), French schoolteacher, a Catholic priest, and botanist
 Augustin Banyaga (born 1947), Rwandan-born American mathematician
 Augustin Barié (1883–1915), French composer and organist
 Augustin Botescu, Romanian football manager
 Augustin Buzura (1938–2017), Romanian novelist and short story writer
 Augustin Cabanès (1862–1928), French doctor, historian and author
 Augustin Călin (footballer) (born 1973), Romanian footballer
 Augustin Călin (football manager) (born 1980), Romanian football manager
 Antoine Augustin Calmet (1672–1757), French Benedictine monk
 Augustin-Louis Cauchy (1789–1857), French mathematician, engineer, and physicist
 Augustin Daly (1838–1899), American playwright
 Augustin Alexandre Darthé (1769–1797), French revolutionary
 Augustin Deleanu (1944–2014), Romanian footballer
 Augustin Pyramus de Candolle (1778–1841), Swiss botanist
 Augustin Joseph Dugas (known as Gus Dugas, 1907–1997), Canadian-born professional baseball player
 Augustin Dumay (born 1949), French violinist and conductor
 Augustin Eduard (born 1962), Romanian professional footballer
 Augustin Ehrensvärd (1710–1772), Swedish military officer, military architect, and artist
 Augustin Ehrensvärd (1887–1968), Swedish nobleman and civil servant
 Augustin Farah (1910–1983), archbishop in Tripoli
 Augustin-Jean Fresnel (1788–1827),  French civil engineer and physicist
 Augustin Gallant (1916–1994), Canadian educator, lawyer and political figure on Prince Edward Island
 Augustin Hacquard (1860–1901), French missionary
 Augustin Iyamuremye (born 1946), Rwandan politician and academic
 Augustin Kambale, ranger in the Congo
 Augustin Landier (born 1974), French economist
 Augustin Lercheimer (pseudonym of Hermann Wilken, 1522–1603), German humanist and mathematician
 Augustin Abel Hector Léveillé (1864–1918), French botanist and clergyman
 Augustin Maillefer (born 1993), Swiss rower
 Augustin Nadal (1659–1741), French author of plays
 Augustin Pacha (1870–1954), Romanian cleric
 Augustin Petrechei (born 1980), Romanian rugby union player
 Augustin Přeučil (1914–1947), Czechoslovakian military pilot and spy
 Augustin Rabeasimbola (born 1988), Malagasy footballer
 Augustin Royer (fl. 1679), French architect
 Augustin Sageret (1763–1851), French botanist
 Charles Augustin Sainte-Beuve (1804–1869), French literary critic
 Johann Martin Augustin Scholz (1794–1852), German Roman Catholic orientalist, biblical scholar and academic theologian
 Augustin Theiner (1804–1874), German theologian and historian
 Augustin Ujka, Albanian footballer
 Augustin Viard (born 1984), French musician

See also
 Augustine (given name)
List of people with given name Augustine
 Augustine (surname)
 Agustín, given name and surname

Surnames of Haitian origin
Czech masculine given names
French masculine given names
Romanian masculine given names
Surnames from given names